The Edmonds–Kingston ferry is a ferry route across Puget Sound between Edmonds and Kingston, Washington.  Since 1951 the only ferries employed on the route have belonged to the Washington state ferry system, currently the largest ferry system in the United States.  The last regularly operated steam ferry on the West Coast of the United States made its final run on this route in 1969.

Description
The route crosses the Puget Sound with Edmonds, Washington as the eastern terminus and Kingston, Washington as the western terminus. The crossing is generally 30 minutes from either terminal.

History
Other ferries used on the route were the Klahanie, the steam ferry San Mateo, and the Evergreen-class motor ferry  (capacity: 981 passengers, 87 autos).

In 1968 the Evergreen-class ferry  (capacity: 1,200 passengers, 87 autos) was assigned as the regular boat on the route.  On Labor Day 1969, the San Mateo became the last steam ferry on the West Coast of the United States to run a regular route.

Terminals

Both terminals at Edmonds and Kingston are equipped with overhead passenger loading. Edmonds is equipped with one vehicle slip, while Kingston is equipped with two. There is also a passenger-only dock at Kingston. It was previously used for the Soundrunner, a passenger only fast-ferry service to Seattle that the Port of Kingston operated between Fall 2010 and Fall 2012.

The Kingston terminal has an extra slip for a spare boat, which was regularly used for a third vessel until the 1970s. In recent years, the spare slip has been used when three vessel service is in place on the Edmonds-Kingston route, usually due to reduced vessel capacity or the suspension of an adjacent run. The spare slip has also been used for storage of vessels when all the slips at the Eagle Harbor maintenance facility are full.

Current status
Since 1999, the vessels normally assigned to the route are the Jumbo class ferry  and the Jumbo Mark II class ferry . The Jumbo class ferry  is frequently assigned when either of the regular boats is out of service or required elsewhere.

See also
 Washington State Ferries
 Ferries in Washington State

Notes

References
 Demoro, Harre, The Evergreen Fleet – A Pictorial History of Washington State Ferries, Golden West Books, San Marino CA (1971) 
 Kline, Mary S., and Bayless, G.A., Ferryboats -- A Legend on Puget Sound, Bayless Books, Seattle, WA (1983) 
  Newell, Gordon, R., ed., H.W. McCurdy Marine History of the Pacific Northwest, Superior Publishing, Seattle, WA (1966)

Ferry routes in western Washington (state)
Transportation in Snohomish County, Washington
History of Snohomish County, Washington
Transportation in Kitsap County, Washington
History of Kitsap County, Washington
Edmonds, Washington